Can't Hold On or I Can't Hold On may refer to:
 "Can't Hold On", a song by Cheap Trick recorded for At Budokan in 1978 and first released on Found All the Parts in 1980
 "I Can't Hold On", a song by Squeeze from the 1982 album Sweets from a Stranger
 "Can't Hold On", a song by Mêlée from the 2007 album Devils & Angels
 "Can't Hold On", a 2010 single by Shiloh